The Italian Renaissance was a period in Italian history covering the 15th and 16th centuries. The period is known for the initial development of the broader Renaissance culture that spread across Western Europe and marked the transition from the Middle Ages to modernity. Proponents of a "long Renaissance" argue that it started around the year 1300 and lasted until about 1600. In some fields, a Proto-Renaissance, beginning around 1250, is typically accepted. The French word renaissance (corresponding to rinascimento in Italian) means "rebirth", and defines the period as one of cultural revival and renewed interest in Classical antiquity after the centuries during what Renaissance humanists labelled as the "Dark Ages". The Italian Renaissance historian Giorgio Vasari used the term rinascita ("rebirth") in his Lives of the Most Excellent Painters, Sculptors, and Architects in 1550, but the concept became widespread only in the 19th century, after the work of scholars such as Jules Michelet and Jacob Burckhardt.

The Renaissance began in Tuscany in Central Italy and centred in the city of Florence. The Florentine Republic, one of the several city-states of the peninsula, rose to economic and political prominence by providing credit for European monarchs and by laying down the groundwork for developments in capitalism and in banking. Renaissance culture later spread to Venice, heart of a Mediterranean empire and in control of the trade routes with the east since its participation in the Crusades and following the journeys of Marco Polo between 1271 and 1295. Thus Italy renewed contact with the remains of ancient Greek culture, which provided humanist scholars with new texts. Finally the Renaissance had a significant effect on the Papal States and on Rome, largely rebuilt by humanist and Renaissance popes, such as Julius II and Leo X, who frequently became involved in Italian politics, in arbitrating disputes between competing colonial powers and in opposing the Protestant Reformation, which started .

The Italian Renaissance has a reputation for its achievements in painting, architecture, sculpture, literature, music, philosophy, science, technology, and exploration. Italy became the recognized European leader in all these areas by the late 15th century, during the era of the Peace of Lodi (1454–1494) agreed between Italian states. The Italian Renaissance peaked in the mid-16th century as domestic disputes and foreign invasions plunged the region into the turmoil of the Italian Wars (1494–1559). However, the ideas and ideals of the Italian Renaissance spread into the rest of Europe, setting off the Northern Renaissance from the late 15th century. Italian explorers from the maritime republics served under the auspices of European monarchs, ushering in the Age of Discovery. The most famous among them include Christopher Columbus (who sailed for Spain), Giovanni da Verrazzano (for France), Amerigo Vespucci (for Portugal), and John Cabot (for England). Italian scientists such as Falloppio, Tartaglia, Galileo and Torricelli played key roles in the Scientific Revolution, and foreigners such as Copernicus and Vesalius worked in Italian universities. Historiographers have proposed various events and dates of the 17th century, such as the conclusion of the European wars of religion in 1648, as marking the end of the Renaissance.

Accounts of proto-Renaissance literature usually begin with the three great Italian writers of the 14th century: Dante Alighieri (Divine Comedy), Petrarch (Canzoniere), and Boccaccio (Decameron). Famous vernacular poets of the Renaissance include the epic authors Luigi Pulci (author of Morgante), Matteo Maria Boiardo (Orlando Innamorato), Ludovico Ariosto (Orlando Furioso), and Torquato Tasso (Jerusalem Delivered, 1581). 15th-century writers such as the poet Poliziano (1454–1494) and the Platonist philosopher Marsilio Ficino (1433–1499) made extensive translations from both Latin and Greek. In the early 16th century, Baldassare Castiglione laid out his vision of the ideal gentleman and lady in The Book of the Courtier (1528), while Niccolò Machiavelli (1469–1527) cast a jaundiced eye on la verità effettuale della cosa 'the effectual truth of things' in The Prince, composed, in humanistic style, chiefly of parallel ancient and modern examples of virtù. Historians of the period include Machiavelli himself, his friend and critic Francesco Guicciardini (1483–1540) and Giovanni Botero (The Reason of State, 1589). The Aldine Press, founded in 1494 by the printer Aldo Manuzio, active in Venice, developed Italic type and pocket editions that one could carry in one's pocket; it became the first to publish printed editions of books in Ancient Greek. Venice also became the birthplace of the commedia dell'arte.

Italian Renaissance art exercised a dominant influence on subsequent European painting and sculpture for centuries afterwards, with artists such as Leonardo da Vinci (1452–1519), Michelangelo (1475–1564), Raphael (1483–1520), Donatello (–1466), Giotto (–1337), Masaccio (1401–1428), Fra Angelico (–1455), Piero della Francesca (–1492), Domenico Ghirlandaio (1448–1494), Perugino (–1523), Botticelli (–1510), and Titian (–1576). Italian Renaissance architecture had a similar Europe-wide impact, as practised by Brunelleschi (1377–1446), Leon Battista Alberti (1404–1472), Andrea Palladio (1508–1580), and Bramante (1444–1514). Their works include the Florence Cathedral (built from 1296 to 1436), St. Peter's Basilica (built 1506–1626) in Rome, and the Tempio Malatestiano (reconstructed from ) in Rimini, as well as several private residences. The musical era of the Italian Renaissance featured composers such as Giovanni Pierluigi da Palestrina (–1594), the Roman School and later the Venetian School, and the birth of opera through figures like Claudio Monteverdi (1567–1643) in Florence. In philosophy, thinkers such as Galileo, Machiavelli, Giordano Bruno (1548–1600) and Pico della Mirandola (1463–1494) emphasized naturalism and humanism, thus rejecting dogma and scholasticism.

Origins and background

Northern and Central Italy in the Late Middle Ages
By the Late Middle Ages (circa 1300 onward), Latium, the former heartland of the Roman Empire, and southern Italy were generally poorer than the North. Rome was a city of ancient ruins, and the Papal States were loosely administered, and vulnerable to external interference, particularly by France, and later Spain. The Papacy was affronted when the Avignon Papacy was created in southern France as a consequence of pressure from King Philip the Fair of France. In the south, Sicily had for some time been under foreign domination, by the Arabs and then the Normans. Sicily had prospered for 150 years during the Emirate of Sicily and later for two centuries during the Norman Kingdom and the Hohenstaufen Kingdom, but had declined by the late Middle Ages.

In contrast, Northern and Central Italy had become far more prosperous, and it has been calculated that the region was among the richest in Europe. The Crusades had built lasting trade links to the Levant, and the Fourth Crusade had done much to destroy the Byzantine Roman Empire as a commercial rival to the Venetians and Genoese. The main trade routes from the east passed through the Byzantine Empire or the Arab lands and onward to the ports of Genoa, Pisa, and Venice. Luxury goods bought in the Levant, such as spices, dyes, and silks were imported to Italy and then resold throughout Europe. Moreover, the inland city-states profited from the rich agricultural land of the Po valley. From France, Germany, and the Low Countries, through the medium of the Champagne fairs, land and river trade routes brought goods such as wool, wheat, and precious metals into the region. The extensive trade that stretched from Egypt to the Baltic generated substantial surpluses that allowed significant investment in mining and agriculture. By the 14th century, the city of Venice had become an emporium for lands as far as Cyprus; it boasted a naval fleet of over 5000 ships thanks to its arsenal, a vast complex of shipyards that was the first European facility to mass-produce commercial and military vessels. Genoa as well had become a maritime power. Thus, while northern Italy was not richer in resources than many other parts of Europe, the level of development, stimulated by trade, allowed it to prosper. In particular, Florence became one of the wealthiest of the cities of Northern Italy, mainly due to its woolen textile production, developed under the supervision of its dominant trade guild, the Arte della Lana. Wool was imported from Northern Europe (and in the 16th century from Spain) and together with dyes from the east were used to make high quality textiles.

The Italian trade routes that covered the Mediterranean and beyond were also major conduits of culture and knowledge. The recovery of lost Greek classics brought to Italy by refugee Byzantine scholars who migrated during and following the Ottoman conquest of the Byzantine Empire in the 15th century were important in sparking the new linguistic studies of the Renaissance, in newly created academies in Florence and Venice. Humanist scholars searched monastic libraries for ancient manuscripts and recovered Tacitus and other Latin authors. The rediscovery of Vitruvius meant that the architectural principles of Antiquity could be observed once more, and Renaissance artists were encouraged, in the atmosphere of humanist optimism, to excel in the achievements of the Ancients, like Apelles, of whom they read.

Religious background 
After the destruction of the Roman Empire in the fifth century AD, the Catholic Church rose to power in Europe. As the gatekeepers, their ruling power applied from the king to the common people. In the Middle Ages, the Church was considered to be conveying the will of God, and it regulated the standard of behaviour in life. A lack of literacy required most people to rely on the priest’s explanation of the Bible and laws.

In the eleventh century, the Church persecuted many groups including pagans, Jews, and lepers in order to eliminate irregularities in society and strengthen its power. In response to the laity’s challenge to Church authority, bishops played an important role, as they gradually lost control of secular authority, and in order to regain the power of discourse, they adopted extreme control methods, such as persecuting infidels.

The Church also collected wealth from believers in the Middle Ages, such as through the sale of indulgences. It also did not pay taxes, making the Church's wealth even more than some kings.

Thirteenth century
In the 13th century, much of Europe experienced strong economic growth. The trade routes of the Italian states linked with those of established Mediterranean ports and eventually the Hanseatic League of the Baltic and northern regions of Europe to create a network economy in Europe for the first time since the 4th century. The city-states of Italy expanded greatly during this period and grew in power to become de facto fully independent of the Holy Roman Empire; apart from the Kingdom of Naples, outside powers kept their armies out of Italy. During this period, the modern commercial infrastructure developed, with double-entry book-keeping, joint stock companies, an international banking system, a systematized foreign exchange market, insurance, and government debt. Florence became the centre of this financial industry and the gold florin became the main currency of international trade.

The new mercantile governing class, who gained their position through financial skill, adapted to their purposes the feudal aristocratic model that had dominated Europe in the Middle Ages. A feature of the High Middle Ages in Northern Italy was the rise of the urban communes which had broken from the control by bishops and local counts. In much of the region, the landed nobility was poorer than the urban patriarchs in the High Medieval money economy whose inflationary rise left land-holding aristocrats impoverished. The increase in trade during the early Renaissance enhanced these characteristics. The decline of feudalism and the rise of cities influenced each other; for example, the demand for luxury goods led to an increase in trade, which led to greater numbers of tradesmen becoming wealthy, who, in turn, demanded more luxury goods. This atmosphere of assumed luxury of the time created a need for the creation of visual symbols of wealth, an important way to show a family's affluence and taste.

This change also gave the merchants almost complete control of the governments of the Italian city-states, again enhancing trade. One of the most important effects of this political control was security. Those that grew extremely wealthy in a feudal state ran the constant risk of running afoul of the monarchy and having their lands confiscated, as famously occurred to Jacques Cœur in France. The northern states also kept many medieval laws that severely hampered commerce, such as those against usury, and prohibitions on trading with non-Christians. In the city-states of Italy, these laws were repealed or rewritten.

Fourteenth-century collapse
The 14th century saw a series of catastrophes that caused the European economy to go into recession. The Medieval Warm Period was ending as the transition to the Little Ice Age began. This change in climate saw agricultural output decline significantly, leading to repeated famines, exacerbated by the rapid population growth of the earlier era. The Hundred Years' War between England and France disrupted trade throughout northwest Europe, most notably when, in 1345, King Edward III of England repudiated his debts, contributing to the collapse of the two largest Florentine banks, those of the Bardi and Peruzzi. In the east, war was also disrupting trade routes, as the Ottoman Empire began to expand throughout the region. Most devastating, though, was the Black Death that decimated the populations of the densely populated cities of Northern Italy and returned at intervals thereafter. Florence, for instance, which had a pre-plague population of 45,000 decreased over the next 47 years by 25–50%. Widespread disorder followed, including a revolt of Florentine textile workers, the ciompi, in 1378.

It was during this period of instability that authors such as Dante and Petrarch lived, and the first stirrings of Renaissance art were to be seen, notably in the realism of Giotto. Paradoxically, some of these disasters would help establish the Renaissance. The Black Death wiped out a third of Europe's population. The resulting labour shortage increased wages and the reduced population was therefore much wealthier, better fed, and, significantly, had more surplus money to spend on luxury goods. As incidences of the plague began to decline in the early 15th century, Europe's devastated population once again began to grow. The new demand for products and services also helped create a growing class of bankers, merchants, and skilled artisans. The horrors of the Black Death and the seeming inability of the Church to provide relief would contribute to a decline of church influence. Additionally, the collapse of the Bardi and Peruzzi banks would open the way for the Medici to rise to prominence in Florence. Roberto Sabatino Lopez argues that the economic collapse was a crucial cause of the Renaissance. According to this view, in a more prosperous era, businessmen would have quickly reinvested their earnings in order to make more money in a climate favourable to investment. However, in the leaner years of the 14th century, the wealthy found few promising investment opportunities for their earnings and instead chose to spend more on culture and art.

Unlike Roman texts, which had been preserved and studied in Western Europe since late antiquity, the study of ancient Greek texts was very limited in medieval Italy. Ancient Greek works on science, maths and philosophy had been studied since the High Middle Ages in Western Europe and in the Islamic Golden Age (normally in translation), but Greek literary, oratorical and historical works (such as Homer, the Greek dramatists, Demosthenes and Thucydides) were not studied in either the Latin or medieval Muslim worlds; in the Middle Ages these sorts of texts were only studied by Byzantine scholars. Some argue that the Timurid Renaissance in Samarkand was linked with the Ottoman Empire, whose conquests led to the migration of Greek scholars to Italy. One of the greatest achievements of Italian Renaissance scholars was to bring this entire class of Greek cultural works back into Western Europe for the first time since late antiquity.

Another popular explanation for the Italian Renaissance is the thesis, first advanced by historian Hans Baron, that states that the primary impetus of the early Renaissance was the long-running series of wars between Florence and Milan. By the late 14th century, Milan had become a centralized monarchy under the control of the Visconti family. Giangaleazzo Visconti, who ruled the city from 1378 to 1402, was renowned both for his cruelty and for his abilities, and set about building an empire in Northern Italy. He launched a long series of wars, with Milan steadily conquering neighbouring states and defeating the various coalitions led by Florence that sought in vain to halt the advance. This culminated in the 1402 siege of Florence when it looked as though the city was doomed to fall, before Giangaleazzo suddenly died and his empire collapsed.

Baron's thesis suggests that during these long wars, the leading figures of Florence rallied the people by presenting the war as one between the free republic and a despotic monarchy, between the ideals of the Greek and Roman Republics and those of the Roman Empire and Medieval kingdoms. For Baron, the most important figure in crafting this ideology was Leonardo Bruni. This time of crisis in Florence was the period when the most influential figures of the early Renaissance were coming of age, such as Ghiberti, Donatello, Masolino, and Brunelleschi. Inculcated with this republican ideology they later went on to advocate republican ideas that were to have an enormous impact on the Renaissance.

Development

International relationships

Northern Italy and upper Central Italy were divided into a number of warring city-states, the most powerful being Milan, Florence, Pisa, Siena, Genoa, Ferrara, Mantua, Verona and Venice. High Medieval Northern Italy was further divided by the long-running battle for supremacy between the forces of the Papacy and of the Holy Roman Empire: each city aligned itself with one faction or the other, yet was divided internally between the two warring parties, Guelfs and Ghibellines. Warfare between the states was common, invasion from outside Italy was confined to intermittent sorties of Holy Roman Emperors. Renaissance politics developed from this background. Since the 13th century, as armies became primarily composed of mercenaries, prosperous city-states could field considerable forces, despite their low populations. In the course of the 15th century, the most powerful city-states annexed their smaller neighbours. Florence took Pisa in 1406, Venice captured Padua and Verona, while the Duchy of Milan annexed a number of nearby areas including Pavia and Parma.

The first part of the Renaissance saw almost constant warfare on land and sea as the city-states vied for preeminence. On land, these wars were primarily fought by armies of mercenaries known as condottieri, bands of soldiers drawn from around Europe, but especially Germany and Switzerland, led largely by Italian captains. The mercenaries were not willing to risk their lives unduly, and war became one largely of sieges and manoeuvring, occasioning few pitched battles. It was also in the interest of mercenaries on both sides to prolong any conflict, to continue their employment. Mercenaries were also a constant threat to their employers; if not paid, they often turned on their patron. If it became obvious that a state was entirely dependent on mercenaries, the temptation was great for the mercenaries to take over the running of it themselves—this occurred on a number of occasions. Neutrality was maintained with France, which found itself surrounded by enemies when Spain disputed Charles VIII's claim to the Kingdom of Naples. Peace with France ended when Charles VIII invaded Italy to take Naples.

At sea, Italian city-states sent many fleets out to do battle. The main contenders were Pisa, Genoa, and Venice, but after a long conflict, the Genoese succeeded in reducing Pisa. Venice proved to be a more powerful adversary, and with the decline of Genoese power during the 15th century Venice became pre-eminent on the seas. In response to threats from the landward side, from the early 15th century Venice developed an increased interest in controlling the terrafirma as the Venetian Renaissance opened.

On land, decades of fighting saw Florence, Milan, and Venice emerge as the dominant players, and these three powers finally set aside their differences and agreed to the Peace of Lodi in 1454, which saw relative calm brought to the region for the first time in centuries. This peace would hold for the next forty years, and Venice's unquestioned hegemony over the sea also led to unprecedented peace for much of the rest of the 15th century. At the beginning of the 15th century, adventurers and traders such as Niccolò Da Conti (1395–1469) travelled as far as Southeast Asia and back, bringing fresh knowledge on the state of the world, presaging further European voyages of exploration in the years to come.

Florence under the Medici

Until the late 14th century, prior to the Medici, Florence's leading family were the House of Albizzi. In 1293 the Ordinances of Justice were enacted which effectively became the constitution of the republic of Florence throughout the Italian Renaissance. The city's numerous luxurious palazzi were becoming surrounded by townhouses, built by the ever prospering merchant class. In 1298, one of the leading banking families of Europe, the Bonsignoris, were bankrupted and so the city of Siena lost her status as the banking centre of Europe to Florence.

The main challengers of the Albizzi family were the Medicis, first under Giovanni de' Medici, later under his son Cosimo de' Medici. The Medici controlled the Medici bank—then Europe's largest bank—and an array of other enterprises in Florence and elsewhere. In 1433, the Albizzi managed to have Cosimo exiled. The next year, however, saw a pro-Medici Signoria elected and Cosimo returned. The Medici became the town's leading family, a position they would hold for the next three centuries. Florence organized the trade routes for commodities between England and the Netherlands, France, and Italy. By the middle of the century, the city had become the banking capital of Europe and thereby obtained vast riches. In 1439, Byzantine Emperor John VIII Palaiologos attended a council in Florence in an attempt to unify the Eastern and Western Churches. This brought books and, especially after the fall of the Byzantine Empire in 1453, an influx of scholars to the city. Ancient Greece began to be studied with renewed interest, especially the Neoplatonic school of thought, which was the subject of an academy established by the Medici.

Florence remained a republic until 1532 (see Duchy of Florence), traditionally marking the end of the High Renaissance in Florence, but the instruments of republican government were firmly under the control of the Medici and their allies, save during the intervals after 1494 and 1527. Cosimo and Lorenzo de' Medici rarely held official posts but were the unquestioned leaders. Cosimo was highly popular among the citizenry, mainly for bringing an era of stability and prosperity to the town. One of his most important accomplishments was negotiating the Peace of Lodi with Francesco Sforza ending the decades of war with Milan and bringing stability to much of Northern Italy. Cosimo was also an important patron of the arts, directly and indirectly, by the influential example he set.

Cosimo was succeeded by his sickly son Piero de' Medici, who died after five years in charge of the city. In 1469 the reins of power passed to Cosimo's 21-year-old grandson Lorenzo, who would become known as "Lorenzo the Magnificent." Lorenzo was the first of the family to be educated from an early age in the humanist tradition and is best known as one of the Renaissance's most important patrons of the arts. Lorenzo reformed Florence’s ruling council from 100 members to 70 , formalizing the Medici rule. The republican institutions continued, but they lost all power. Lorenzo was less successful than his illustrious forebears in business, and the Medici commercial empire was slowly eroded. Lorenzo continued the alliance with Milan, but relations with the papacy soured, and in 1478, Papal agents allied with the Pazzi family in an attempt to assassinate Lorenzo. Although the Pazzi conspiracy failed, Lorenzo's young brother, Giuliano, was killed, and the failed assassination led to a war with the Papacy and was used as justification to further centralize power in Lorenzo's hands.

Spread

Renaissance ideals first spread from Florence to the neighbouring states of Tuscany such as Siena and Lucca. The Tuscan culture soon became the model for all the states of Northern Italy, and the Tuscan dialect came to predominate throughout the region, especially in literature. In 1447 Francesco Sforza came to power in Milan and rapidly transformed that still medieval city into a major centre of art and learning that drew Leone Battista Alberti. Venice, one of the wealthiest cities due to its control of the Adriatic Sea, also became a centre for Renaissance culture, especially Venetian Renaissance architecture. Smaller courts brought Renaissance patronage to lesser cities, which developed their characteristic arts: Ferrara, Mantua under the Gonzaga, and Urbino under Federico da Montefeltro. In Naples, the Renaissance was ushered in under the patronage of Alfonso I, who conquered Naples in 1443 and encouraged artists like Francesco Laurana and Antonello da Messina and writers like the poet Jacopo Sannazaro and the humanist scholar Angelo Poliziano.

In 1417 the Papacy returned to Rome, but that once-imperial city remained poor and largely in ruins through the first years of the Renaissance. The great transformation began under Pope Nicholas V, who became pontiff in 1447. He launched a dramatic rebuilding effort that would eventually see much of the city renewed. The humanist scholar Aeneas Silvius Piccolomini became Pope Pius II in 1458. As the papacy fell under the control of the wealthy families, such as the Medici and the Borgias, the spirit of Renaissance art and philosophy came to dominate the Vatican. Pope Sixtus IV continued Nicholas' work, most famously ordering the construction of the Sistine Chapel. The popes also became increasingly secular rulers as the Papal States were forged into a centralized power by a series of "warrior popes".

The nature of the Renaissance also changed in the late 15th century. The Renaissance ideal was fully adopted by the ruling classes and the aristocracy. In the early Renaissance artists were seen as craftsmen with little prestige or recognition. By the later Renaissance, the top figures wielded great influence and could charge great fees. A flourishing trade in Renaissance art developed. While in the early Renaissance many of the leading artists were of lower- or middle-class origins, increasingly they became aristocrats.

Wider population
As a cultural movement, the Italian Renaissance affected only a small part of the population. Italy was the most urbanized region of Europe, but three-quarters of the people were still rural peasants. For this section of the population, life remained essentially unchanged from the Middle Ages. Classic feudalism had never been prominent in Northern Italy, and most peasants worked on private farms or as sharecroppers. Some scholars see a trend towards refeudalization in the later Renaissance as the urban elites turned themselves into landed aristocrats.

The situation differed in the cities. These were dominated by a commercial elite; as exclusive as the aristocracy of any Medieval kingdom. This group became the main patrons of and audience for Renaissance culture. Below them, there was a large class of artisans and guild members who lived comfortable lives and had significant power in the republican governments. This was in sharp contrast to the rest of Europe where artisans were firmly in the lower class. Literate and educated, this group did participate in the Renaissance culture. The largest section of the urban population was the urban poor of semi-skilled workers and the unemployed. Like the peasants, the Renaissance had little effect on them. Historians debate how easy it was to move between these groups during the Italian Renaissance. Examples of individuals who rose from humble beginnings can be instanced, but Burke notes two major studies in this area that have found that the data do not clearly demonstrate an increase in social mobility. Most historians feel that early in the Renaissance social mobility was quite high, but that it faded over the course of the 15th century. Inequality in society was very high. An upper-class figure would control hundreds of times more income than a servant or labourer. Some historians see this unequal distribution of wealth as important to the Renaissance, as art patronage relies on the very wealthy.

The Renaissance was not a period of great social or economic change, only of cultural and ideological development. It only touched a small fraction of the population, and in modern times this has led many historians, such as any that follow historical materialism, to reduce the importance of the Renaissance in human history. These historians tend to think in terms of "Early Modern Europe" instead. Roger Osborne argues that "The Renaissance is a difficult concept for historians because the history of Europe quite suddenly turns into a history of Italian painting, sculpture and architecture."

The waning of the Renaissance in Italy

The end of the Italian Renaissance is as imprecisely marked as its starting point. For many, the rise to power in Florence of the austere monk Girolamo Savonarola in 1494–1498 marks the end of the city's flourishing; for others, the triumphant return of the Medici family to power in 1512 marks the beginning of the late phase in the Renaissance arts called Mannerism. Other accounts trace the end of the Italian Renaissance to the French invasions of the early 16th century and the subsequent conflict between France and Spanish rulers for control of Italian territory. Savonarola rode to power on a widespread backlash over the secularism and indulgence of the Renaissance. His brief rule saw many works of art destroyed in the "Bonfire of the Vanities" in the centre of Florence. With the Medici returned to power, now as Grand Dukes of Tuscany, the counter movement in the church continued. In 1542 the Sacred Congregation of the Inquisition was formed and a few years later the Index Librorum Prohibitorum banned a wide array of Renaissance works of literature, which marks the end of the illuminated manuscript together with Giulio Clovio, who is considered the greatest illuminator of the Italian High Renaissance, and arguably the last very notable artist in the long tradition of the illuminated manuscript, before some modern revivals.

Under the suppression of the Catholic Church and the ravages of war, humanism became "akin to heresy".

Equally important was the end of stability with a series of foreign invasions of Italy known as the Italian Wars that would continue for several decades. These began with the 1494 invasion by France that wreaked widespread devastation on Northern Italy and ended the independence of many of the city-states. Most damaging was the 6 May 1527, Spanish and German troops' sacking Rome that for two decades all but ended the role of the Papacy as the largest patron of Renaissance art and architecture.

While the Italian Renaissance was fading, the Northern Renaissance adopted many of its ideals and transformed its styles. A number of Italy's greatest artists chose to emigrate. The most notable example was Leonardo da Vinci, who left for France in 1516, but teams of lesser artists invited to transform the Château de Fontainebleau created the School of Fontainebleau that infused the style of the Italian Renaissance in France. From Fontainebleau, the new styles, transformed by Mannerism, brought the Renaissance to the Low Countries and thence throughout Northern Europe.

This spread north was also representative of a larger trend. No longer was the Mediterranean Europe's most important trade route. In 1498, Vasco da Gama reached India, and from that date the primary route of goods from the Orient was through the Atlantic ports of Lisbon, Seville, Nantes, Bristol, and London.

Culture

Literature and poetry

The thirteenth-century Italian literary revolution helped set the stage for the Renaissance. Prior to the Renaissance, the Italian language was not the literary language in Italy. It was only in the 13th century that Italian authors began writing in their native language rather than Latin, French, or Provençal. The 1250s saw a major change in Italian poetry as the Dolce Stil Novo (Sweet New Style, which emphasized Platonic rather than courtly love) came into its own, pioneered by poets like Guittone d'Arezzo and Guido Guinizelli. Especially in poetry, major changes in Italian literature had been taking place decades before the Renaissance truly began.

With the printing of books initiated in Venice by Aldus Manutius, an increasing number of works began to be published in the Italian language in addition to the flood of Latin and Greek texts that constituted the mainstream of the Italian Renaissance. The source for these works expanded beyond works of theology and towards the pre-Christian eras of Imperial Rome and Ancient Greece. This is not to say that no religious works were published in this period: Dante Alighieri's The Divine Comedy reflects a distinctly medieval world view. Christianity remained a major influence for artists and authors, with the classics coming into their own as a second primary influence.

In the early Italian Renaissance, much of the focus was on translating and studying classic works from Latin and Greek. Renaissance authors were not content to rest on the laurels of ancient authors, however. Many authors attempted to integrate the methods and styles of the ancient Greeks into their own works. Among the most emulated Romans are Cicero, Horace, Sallust, and Virgil. Among the Greeks, Aristotle, Homer, and Plato were now being read in the original for the first time since the 4th century, though Greek compositions were few.

The literature and poetry of the Renaissance was largely influenced by the developing science and philosophy. The humanist Francesco Petrarch, a key figure in the renewed sense of scholarship, was also an accomplished poet, publishing several important works of poetry. He wrote poetry in Latin, notably the Punic War epic Africa, but is today remembered for his works in the Italian vernacular, especially the Canzoniere, a collection of love sonnets dedicated to his unrequited love Laura. He was the foremost writer of Petrarchan sonnets, and translations of his work into English by Thomas Wyatt established the sonnet form in that country, where it was employed by William Shakespeare and countless other poets.

Petrarch's disciple, Giovanni Boccaccio, became a major author in his own right. His major work was the Decameron, a collection of 100 stories told by ten storytellers who have fled to the outskirts of Florence to escape the black plague over ten nights. The Decameron in particular and Boccaccio's work, in general, were a major source of inspiration and plots for many English authors in the Renaissance, including Geoffrey Chaucer and William Shakespeare.

Aside from Christianity, classical antiquity, and scholarship, a fourth influence on Renaissance literature was politics. The political philosopher Niccolò Machiavelli's most famous works are Discourses on Livy, Florentine Histories and finally The Prince, which has become so well known in modern societies that the word Machiavellian has come to refer to the cunning and ruthless actions advocated by the book. Along with many other Renaissance works, The Prince remains a relevant and influential work of literature today.

There were many Italian Renaissance humanists who also praised and affirmed the beauty of the body in poetry and literature. In Baldassare Rasinus's panegyric for Francesco Sforza, Rasinus considered that beautiful people usually have virtue. In northern Italy, humanists had discussions about the connection between physical beauty and inner virtues. In Renaissance Italy, virtue and beauty were often linked together to praise men.

Philosophy

One role of Petrarch is as the founder of a new method of scholarship, Renaissance humanism.

Petrarch encouraged the study of the Latin classics and carried his copy of Homer about, at a loss to find someone to teach him to read Greek. An essential step in the classic humanist education being propounded by scholars like Pico della Mirandola was the hunting down of lost or forgotten manuscripts that were known only by reputation. These endeavours were greatly aided by the wealth of Italian patricians, merchant-princes and despots, who would spend substantial sums building libraries. Discovering the past had become fashionable and it was a passionate affair pervading the upper reaches of society. I go, said Cyriac of Ancona, I go to awake the dead. As the Greek works were acquired, manuscripts found, libraries and museums formed, the age of the printing press was dawning. The works of Antiquity were translated from Greek and Latin into the contemporary modern languages throughout Europe, finding a receptive middle-class audience, which might be, like Shakespeare, "with little Latin and less Greek".

While concern for philosophy, art, and literature all increased greatly in the Renaissance, the period is usually seen as one of scientific backwardness. The reverence for classical sources further enshrined the Aristotelian and Ptolemaic views of the universe. Humanism stressed that nature came to be viewed as an animate spiritual creation that was not governed by laws or mathematics. At the same time, philosophy lost much of its rigour as the rules of logic and deduction were seen as secondary to intuition and emotion.

Science and technology

During the Renaissance, great advances occurred in geography, astronomy, chemistry, physics, mathematics, manufacturing, anatomy and engineering. The collection of ancient scientific texts began in earnest at the start of the 15th century and continued up to the Fall of Constantinople in 1453, and the invention of printing democratized learning and allowed a faster propagation of new ideas. Although humanists often favored human-centered subjects like politics and history over study of natural philosophy or applied mathematics, many others went beyond these interests and had a positive influence on mathematics and science by rediscovering lost or obscure texts and by emphasizing the study of original languages and the correct reading of texts.

Italian universities such as Padua, Bologna and Pisa were scientific centres of renown and with many northern European students, the science of the Renaissance spread to Northern Europe and flourished there as well. Figures such as Copernicus, Francis Bacon, Descartes, and Galileo made contributions to scientific thought and experimentation, paving the way for the scientific revolution that later flourished in Northern Europe. Bodies were also stolen from gallows and examined by many like Andreas Vesalius, a professor of anatomy. This allowed him to create more accurate skeleton models by making more than 200 corrections to the works of Galen who dissected animals.

Mathematics 
Major developments in mathematics include the spread of algebra throughout Europe, especially Italy. Luca Pacioli published a book on mathematics at the end of the fifteenth century, in which he first published positive and negative signs. Basic mathematical symbols were introduced by Simon Stevin in the 16th and early 17th centuries. Symbolic algebra was established by the French mathematician François Viete in the 16th century. He published "Introduction to Analytical Methods" in 1591, systematically sorting out algebra, and for the first time consciously using letters to represent unknown and known numbers. In his other book "On the Recognition and Correction of Equations," Viete improved the solution of the third degree and fourth-degree equations, and also established the relationship between the roots and coefficients of quadratic and cubic equations, which is called “Viete's formulas” now. Trigonometry also achieved greater development during the Renaissance. The German mathematician Regiomontanus’s "On Triangles of All Kinds" was Europe's first trigonometric work independent of astronomy. The book systematically elaborated plane triangles and spherical triangles, as well as a very precise table of trigonometric functions.

Painting and sculpture

In painting, the Late Medieval painter Giotto di Bondone, or Giotto, helped shape the artistic concepts that later defined much of the Renaissance art. The key ideas that he explored – classicism, the illusion of three-dimensional space and a realistic emotional context – inspired other artists such as Masaccio, Michelangelo and Leonardo da Vinci. He was not the only Medieval artist to develop these ideas, however; the artists Pietro Cavallini and Cimabue both influenced Giotto's use of statuesque figures and expressive storylines.

The frescos of Florentine artist Masaccio are generally considered to be among the earliest examples of Italian Renaissance art. Masaccio incorporated the ideas of Giotto, Donatello and Brunelleschi into his paintings, creating mathematically precise scenes that give the impression of three-dimensional space. The Holy Trinity fresco in the Florentine church of Santa Maria Novella, for example, looks as if it is receding at a dramatic angle into the dark background, while single-source lighting and foreshortening appear to push the figure of Christ into the viewer's space.

While mathematical precision and classical idealism fascinated painters in Rome and Florence, many Northern artists in the regions of Venice, Milan and Parma preferred highly illusionistic scenes of the natural world. The period also saw the first secular (non-religious) themes. There has been much debate as to the degree of secularism in the Renaissance, which had been emphasized by early 20th-century writers like Jacob Burckhardt based on, among other things, the presence of a relatively small number of mythological paintings. Those of Botticelli, notably The Birth of Venus and Primavera, are now among the best known, although he was deeply religious (becoming a follower of Savonarola) and the great majority of his output was of traditional religious paintings or portraits.

In sculpture, the Florentine artist Donato di Niccolò di Betto Bardi, or Donatello, was among the earliest sculptors to translate classical references into marble and bronze. His second sculpture of David was the first free-standing bronze nude created in Europe since the Roman Empire.

The period known as the High Renaissance of painting was the culmination of the varied means of expression and various advances in painting technique, such as linear perspective, the realistic depiction of both physical and psychological features, and the manipulation of light and darkness, including tone contrast, sfumato (softening the transition between colours) and chiaroscuro (contrast between light and dark), in a single unifying style which expressed total compositional order, balance and harmony. In particular, the individual parts of the painting had a complex but balanced and well-knit relationship to the whole. The most famous painters from this phase are Leonardo da Vinci, Raphael, and Michelangelo and their images, including Leonardo's The Last Supper and Mona Lisa, Raphael's The School of Athens and Michelangelo's Sistine Chapel Ceiling are the masterpieces of the period and among the most widely known works of art in the world.

High Renaissance painting evolved into Mannerism, especially in Florence. Mannerist artists, who consciously rebelled against the principles of High Renaissance, tend to represent elongated figures in illogical spaces. Modern scholarship has recognized the capacity of Mannerist art to convey strong (often religious) emotion where the High Renaissance failed to do so. Some of the main artists of this period are Pontormo, Bronzino, Rosso Fiorentino, Parmigianino and Raphael's pupil Giulio Romano.

Architecture

In Florence, the Renaissance style was introduced with a revolutionary but incomplete monument by Leone Battista Alberti. Some of the earliest buildings showing Renaissance characteristics are Filippo Brunelleschi's church of San Lorenzo and the Pazzi Chapel. The interior of Santo Spirito expresses a new sense of light, clarity and spaciousness, which is typical of the early Italian Renaissance. Its architecture reflects the philosophy of Renaissance humanism, the enlightenment and clarity of mind as opposed to the darkness and spirituality of the Middle Ages. The revival of classical antiquity can best be illustrated by the Palazzo Rucellai. Here the pilasters follow the superposition of classical orders, with Doric capitals on the ground floor, Ionic capitals on the piano nobile and Corinthian capitals on the uppermost floor. Soon, Renaissance architects favoured grand, large domes over tall and imposing spires, doing away with the Gothic style of the predating ages.

In Mantua, Alberti ushered in the new antique style, though his culminating work, Sant'Andrea, was not begun until 1472, after the architect's death.

The High Renaissance, as we call the style today, was introduced to Rome with Donato Bramante's Tempietto at San Pietro in Montorio (1502) and his original centrally planned St. Peter's Basilica (1506), which was the most notable architectural commission of the era, influenced by almost all notable Renaissance artists, including Michelangelo and Giacomo della Porta. The beginning of the late Renaissance in 1550 was marked by the development of a new column order by Andrea Palladio. Giant order columns that were two or more stories tall decorated the facades.

During the Italian Renaissance, mathematics was developed and spread widely. As a result, some Renaissance architects used mathematical knowledge like calculation in their drawings, such as Baldassarre Peruzzi.

Music

In Italy, during the 14th century, there was an explosion of musical activity that corresponded in scope and level of innovation to the activity in the other arts. Although musicologists typically group the music of the Trecento (music of the 14th century) with the late medieval period, it included features which align with the early Renaissance in important ways: an increasing emphasis on secular sources, styles and forms; a spreading of culture away from ecclesiastical institutions to the nobility, and even to the common people; and quick development of entirely new techniques. The principal forms were the Trecento madrigal, the caccia, and the ballata. Overall, the musical style of the period is sometimes labelled as the "Italian ars nova." From the early 15th century to the middle of the 16th century, the centre of innovation in religious music was in the Low Countries, and a flood of talented composers came to Italy from this region. Many of them sang in either the papal choir in Rome or the choirs at the numerous chapels of the aristocracy, in Rome, Venice, Florence, Milan, Ferrara and elsewhere; and they brought their polyphonic style with them, influencing many native Italian composers during their stay.

The predominant forms of sacred music during the period were the mass and the motet. By far the most famous composer of church music in 16th-century Italy was Palestrina, the most prominent member of the Roman School, whose style of smooth, emotionally cool polyphony was to become the defining sound of the late 16th century, at least for generations of 19th- and 20th-century musicologists. Other Italian composers of the late 16th century focused on composing the main secular form of the era, the madrigal; for almost a hundred years these secular songs for multiple singers were distributed all over Europe. Composers of madrigals included Jacques Arcadelt, at the beginning of the age, Cipriano de Rore, in the middle of the century, and Luca Marenzio, Philippe de Monte, Carlo Gesualdo, and Claudio Monteverdi at the end of the era. Italy was also a centre of innovation in instrumental music. By the early 16th-century keyboard improvisation came to be greatly valued, and numerous composers of virtuoso keyboard music appeared. Many familiar instruments were invented and perfected in late Renaissance Italy, such as the violin, the earliest forms of which came into use in the 1550s.

By the late 16th century Italy was the musical centre of Europe. Almost all of the innovations which were to define the transition to the Baroque period originated in northern Italy in the last few decades of the century. In Venice, the polychoral productions of the Venetian School, and associated instrumental music, moved north into Germany; in Florence, the Florentine Camerata developed monody, the important precursor to opera, which itself first appeared around 1600; and the avant-garde, manneristic style of the Ferrara school, which migrated to Naples and elsewhere through the music of Carlo Gesualdo, was to be the final statement of the polyphonic vocal music of the Renaissance.

Historiography 
Any unified theory of a renaissance, or cultural overhaul, during the European early modern period is overwhelmed by a massive volume of differing historiographical approaches. Historians like Jacob Burckhardt (1818–1897) have often romanticized the enlightened vision that Italian Renaissance writers have promulgated concerning their own narrative of denouncing the fruitlessness of the Middle Ages. By promoting the Renaissance as the definitive end to the "stagnant" Middle Ages, the Renaissance has acquired the powerful and enduring association with progress and prosperity for which Burckhardt's The Civilization of the Renaissance in Italy is most responsible. Modern scholars have objected to this prevailing narrative, citing the medieval period's own vibrancy and key continuities that link, rather than divide, the Middle Ages and the Renaissance.

Elizabeth Lehfeldt (2005) points to the Black Death as a turning point in Europe that set in motion several movements that were gaining massive traction in the years before, and has accounted for many subsequent events and trends in Western civilization, such as the Reformation. Rather than see this as a distinct cutoff between eras of history, the rejuvenated approach to studying the Renaissance aims to look at this as a catalyst that accelerated trends in art and science that were already well developed. For example, Danse Macabre, the artistic movement using death as the focal point, is often credited as a Renaissance trend, yet Lehfeldt argues that the emergence of Gothic art during medieval times was morphed into Danse Macabre after the Black Death swept over Europe.

Recent historians who take a more revisionist perspective, such as Charles Haskins (1860–1933), identify the hubris and nationalism of Italian politicians, thinkers, and writers as the cause of the distortion of the attitude towards the early modern period. In The Renaissance of the Twelfth Century (1927), Haskins asserts that it is human nature to draw stark divides in history in order to better understand the past. However, it is essential to understand history as continuous and constantly building off of the past. Haskins was one of the leading scholars in this school of thought, and it was his (along with several others) belief that the building blocks for the Italian Renaissance were all laid during the Middle Ages, calling on the rise of towns and bureaucratic states in the late 11th century as proof of the significance of this "pre-renaissance." The flow of history that he describes paints the Renaissance as a continuation of the Middle Ages that may not have been as positive of a change as popularly imagined. Many historians after Burckhardt have argued that the regression of the Latin language, economic recession, and social inequality during the Renaissance have been intentionally glossed over by previous historians in order to promote the mysticism of the era.

Burckhardt famously described the Middle Ages as a period that was "seen clad in strange hues", promoting the idea that this era was inherently dark, confusing, and unprogressive. The term middle ages was first referred to by humanists such as Petrarch and Biondo, during the late 15th century, describing it as a period connecting an important beginning and an important end, and as a placeholder for the history that exists between both sides of the period. This period was eventually referred to as the "dark" ages in the 19th century by English historians, which has further tainted the narrative of medieval times in favour of promoting a positive feeling of the individualism and humanism that spurred from the Renaissance.

See also
 Italian Renaissance garden
 Italian Renaissance interior design

Notes

References

 Baker, Nicholas Scott. The Fruit of Liberty: Political Culture in the Florentine Renaissance, 1480-1550. Harvard University Press, 2013.
 Baron, Hans. The Crisis of the Early Italian Renaissance: Civic Humanism and Republican Liberty in an Age of Classicism and Tyranny. Princeton: Princeton University Press, 1966.
 
 
 Burckhardt, Jacob. The Civilization of the Renaissance in Italy. 1878 (online).
 Burke, Peter. The Italian Renaissance: Culture and Society in Italy. Princeton: Princeton University Press, 1999.
 Capra, Fritjof (2008). The Science of Leonardo. Inside the Mind of the Great Genius of the Renaissance. Doubleday, .
 Ceriani Sebregondi, Giulia. On Architectural Practice and Arithmetic Abilities in Renaissance Italy. Architectural Histories, vol. 3, no. 1, 2015 (online).
 Cronin, Vincent:
 The Florentine Renaissance. 1967, .
 The Flowering of the Renaissance. 1969, .
 The Renaissance. 1992, .
 Hagopian, Viola L. "Italy", in Stanley Sadie (ed.). The New Grove Dictionary of Music and Musicians. London: Macmillan Publishers Ltd., 1980.
 Hay, Denys. The Italian Renaissance in Its Historical Background. Cambridge: Cambridge University Press, 1977.
 Jensen, De Lamar. Renaissance Europe. 1992.
 Jurdjevic, Mark. "Hedgehogs and Foxes: The Present and Future of Italian Renaissance Intellectual History", in Past & Present 195 (2007), p. 241–268.
 
 Lopez, Robert Sabatino. The Three Ages of the Italian Renaissance. Charlottesville: University Press of Virginia, 1970.
 Pullan, Brian S. History of Early Renaissance Italy. London: Lane, 1973.
 Raffini, Christine. Marsilio Ficino, Pietro Bembo, Baldassare Castiglione: Philosophical, Aesthetic, and Political Approaches in Renaissance Platonism. Renaissance and Baroque Studies and Texts 21, Peter Lang Publishing, 1998, .
 Ruggiero, Guido. The Renaissance in Italy: A Social and Cultural History of the Rinascimento. Cambridge University Press, 2015 (online review).

External links

 The High Renaissance in Florence – video
 Victoria and Albert Museum: Renaissance House
 The Prince by Niccolò Machiavelli  –

 
14th-century establishments in Italy
17th-century disestablishments in Italy
Renaissance
Renaissance
Italian Renaissance
Italian Renaissanceworks

Renaissance art
Renaissance architecture
Italy
Italy
Italian Renaissance

European civilizations